Stephen Shelby Sawyer (born August 30, 1952, in Paris, KY, U.S.) is an American commercial artist known for his Christianist depictions of Jesus Christ, as well as for his business, Art 4 God. His work has been featured in many magazines, over 400 newspapers such as the full front page of The New York Times, and news shows such as The Today Show. Since 1995, Sawyer travels to several locations in America and occasionally other countries as a motivational speaker. He resides in Versailles, Kentucky, with his wife, Cindy Sawyer, and his children, along with his studio.

References

External links
Art for God

1952 births
Living people
20th-century American painters
American male painters
21st-century American painters
Painters from Kentucky
People from Paris, Kentucky
People from Versailles, Kentucky
20th-century American male artists